Victor Alexander Barton (6 October 1867 – 23 March 1906) was an English soldier and cricketer. He played for Kent County Cricket Club in 1889 and 1890 and for Hampshire County Cricket Club as a professional between 1892 and 1902. He played one Test match for England in 1892 and made one appearance for Southampton Football Club as a goalkeeper.

Early life
Barton was born in Netley in Hampshire. He served in the Royal Artillery as a regular soldier and held the rank of Bombardier when he first played for Kent in 1889.

Cricket career
Barton was first noted as a cricketer when he played for the Royal Artillery Cricket Club (RACC) against Marylebone Cricket Club (MCC) at Lord's in June 1889. Wisden described his batting as "a superb performance" as he scored 91 out of a total of 167 in the RACC first innings and 102 out of 171 in their second innings. He took six wickets in the match as RACC beat MCC, his performance earning him a trial with Kent.

Barton played eleven times for Kent over the following two seasons whilst still a regular soldier, making his first-class cricket debut in July 1889 in a County match against Yorkshire at Mote Park. Barton never established himself fully in the Kent team and he bought himself out of the Royal Artillery in 1891 in order to move to Hampshire as a professional player.

During the 1891–92 English winter Barton took part in an England tour to South Africa as part of a side led by Walter Read. This was one of two simultaneous England team tours, the other touring Australia. Barton played in ten non-first-class matches on the tour and in the only match against a South African XI at Newlands Cricket Ground which was later recognised as a Test match. Barton is the only regular member of the Royal Artillery to have played Test cricket.

Hampshire did not have first-class status in 1892 and Barton played a number of non-first-class matches for the county from the 1892 season until Hampshire regained their status in advance of the 1895 season. He played in 143 first-class matches for Hampshire before retiring due to ill-health at the end of the 1902 season. He scored six centuries during his career, including a highest score of 205 made against Sussex in 1900, and took 141 first-class wickets.

Football career
Barton also played football as a goalkeeper, making one appearance for Southampton St. Mary's in the semi-final of the Hampshire Senior Cup in February 1893. In the match, played at the County Ground, Southampton, the Saints defeated Portsmouth 2–0. Barton was injured by the time of the final on 11 March and was replaced by Ralph Ruffell, with Southampton going down 2–1 to local rivals Freemantle.

Life outside sport
In partnership with former Southampton St. Mary's footballer Jack Dorkin, Barton ran a sports outfitters business in London Road, Southampton. He was later the manager of the Alexandra Hotel in Southampton, where he died on 23 March 1906, aged 38.

References

External links

1867 births
People from Netley
1906 deaths
English cricketers
England Test cricketers
Hampshire cricketers
Kent cricketers
Players cricketers
English footballers
Association football goalkeepers
Southampton F.C. players
Royal Artillery soldiers
North v South cricketers